Stephen Polin is an American artist.

He was born to a Russian Jewish family in 1947 and attended the Hun School of Princeton, from which he graduated in 1965.  His  work is most famous for his surrealist paintings. His work has been exhibited worldwide, including at the Bodley Gallery. His most recent projects have been commissioned by the owners of Smarty Jones and by Mercedes-Benz.
Stephen Polin uses the signature S.P. Xyxx on work subsequent to 1979.  His styles now have incorporated elements of impressionism as well as photorealism.

References

See also
Bodley Gallery
The Hun School

1947 births
Living people
Jewish American artists
20th-century American painters
American male painters
21st-century American painters
21st-century American male artists
Hun School of Princeton alumni
Jewish painters
Russian Jews
Artists from Philadelphia
21st-century American Jews
20th-century American male artists